Hanspeter Pfister is a Swiss computer scientist. He is the An Wang Professor of Computer Science at the Harvard John A. Paulson School of Engineering and Applied Sciences and an affiliate faculty member of the Center for Brain Science at Harvard University. His research in visual computing lies at the intersection of scientific visualization, information visualization, computer graphics, and computer vision and spans a wide range of topics, including biomedical image analysis and visualization, image and video analysis, and visual analytics in data science.

Biography 
Hanspeter Pfister received his master's degree in 1991 in electrical engineering at ETH Zurich and moved to the United States for his PhD in computer science at Stony Brook University. In 1992 he began working with Arie Kaufman on Cube-3, a hardware architecture for volume visualization. By the time of his graduation in 1996, he had finished the architecture for Cube-4 and licensed it to Mitsubishi Electric Research Laboratories. He joined Mitsubishi Electric Research Laboratories in 1996 as a research scientists, where he worked for over a decade. He was the chief architect of VolumePro, Mitsubishi Electric's real-time volume rendering graphics card, for which he received the Mitsubishi Electric President's Award in 2000. He joined the faculty at Harvard University in 2007.  In 2012 Hanspeter Pfister was appointed the An Wang Professor of Computer Science and started his research lab called the Visual Computing Group. In the same year, he also served as the Technical Papers Chair at SIGGRAPH and became a consultant for Disney Research From 2013 to 2017, Hanspeter Pfister was the director of the Institute for Applied Computational Science at the Harvard John A. Paulson School of Engineering and Applied Sciences.

Awards and prizes

 2019, Elected as ACM Fellow
 2019, Elected into the IEEE Visualization Academy as a recognition for his achievements in the scientific visualization and information visualization research communities.
 2011, Dean's Thesis Prize, Harvard Extension School ALM in Information Technology, for Michael Tracey Zellman's thesis “Creating and Visualizing Congressional Districts”
 2010, IEEE Visualization Technical Achievement Award.
 2009, IEEE Golden Core Award.
 2009, IEEE Meritorious Service Award.
 2009, Petra T. Shattuck Excellence in Teaching Award.
 2009, Dean's Thesis Prize, Harvard Extension School ALM in Information Technology, for Manish Kumar's thesis “View-Dependent FTLV”
 2007, Dean's Thesis Prize, Harvard Extension School ALM in Information Technology, for Joseph Weber's thesis “ProteinShader: Cartoon-Type Visualization of Macromolecules Using Programmable Graphics Cards”
 2005, Dean's Thesis Prize, Harvard Extension School ALM in Information Technology, for George P. Stathis’ thesis “Aspect-Oriented Shade Trees”
 2002, 2003, and 2004, Distinguished Teaching Performance, Harvard Extension School
 2000, Mitsubishi Electric President's Award.
 1999, Innovation Awards and Top 100 Products Award for VolumePro
 1994, The Jack Heller Award for Outstanding Contribution to the CS Department, SUNY Stony Brook
 1992, Swiss Academy of Technical Sciences Fellowship
 1991 and 1992, ABB Switzerland Research Fellowship
 1991–1996, U.S. Government Fulbright Scholarship

Most relevant publications

As of Dec 2019, according to Google Scholar, Hanspeter Pfister's most cited publications are:

 Pfister, H., Zwicker, M., Van Baar, J., & Gross, M. (2000). Surfels: Surface elements as rendering primitives. In Proceedings of the 27th annual conference on Computer graphics and interactive techniques, 335–342.
 Zwicker, M., Pfister, H., Van Baar, J., & Gross, M. (2001). Surface splatting. In Proceedings of the 28th annual conference on Computer graphics and interactive techniques, 371–378.
 Marks, J., Andalman, B., Beardsley, P. A., Freeman, W., Gibson, S., Hodgins, J., Kang, T., Mirtich, B., Pfister, H., Ruml, W., et al. (1997). Design galleries: A general approach to setting parameters for computer graphics and animation. In Proceedings of the 24th annual conference on Computer graphics and interactive techniques, 389–400.
 Matusik, W., & Pfister, H. (2004). 3D TV: a scalable system for real-time acquisition, transmission, and autostereoscopic display of dynamic scenes. In ACM Transactions on Graphics (TOG), 23, 3, 814–824.
 Vlasic, D., Brand, M., Pfister, H., & Popović, J. (2005). Face transfer with multilinear models. In ACM transactions on graphics (TOG), 24, 3, 426–433.
 Pfister, H., Hardenbergh, J., Knittel, J., Lauer, H., and Seiler, L. (1999). The VolumePro real-time ray-casting system. In Proceedings of the 26th Annual Conference on Computer Graphics and Interactive Techniques, SIGGRAPH 99, 251–260.
 Kasthuri, N., Hayworth, K. J., Berger, D. R., Schalek, R. L., Conchello, J. e. A., Knowles-Barley, S., Lee, D., Vãzquez Reina, A., Kaynig, V., Jones, T. R., et al. (2015). Saturated reconstruction of a volume of neocortex. Cell, 162(3):648–661.
 Lex, A., Gehlenborg, N., Strobelt, H., Vuillemot, R., & Pfister, H. (2014). UpSet: visualization of intersecting sets. IEEE transactions on visualization and computer graphics, 20(12), 1983–1992.
 Pfister, H., Lorensen, B., Bajaj, C., Kindlmann, G., Schroeder, W., Avila, L. S., Raghu, K. M., Machiraju, R. & Lee, J. (2001). The transfer function bake-off. IEEE Computer Graphics and Applications, 21(3), 16–22.
 Borkin, M. A., Vo, A. A., Bylinskii, Z., Isola, P., Sunkavalli, S., Oliva, A., & Pfister, H. (2013). What makes a visualization memorable?. IEEE Transactions on Visualization and Computer Graphics, 19(12), 2306–2315.

A complete list of Hanspeter Pfister's publications can be found on his research group's website.

References 

Living people
German computer scientists
Computer graphics researchers
Stony Brook University alumni
ETH Zurich alumni
Harvard University faculty
Year of birth uncertain
Information visualization experts
Disney Research people
Mitsubishi Electric people
Fellows of the Association for Computing Machinery
1964 births